Imawatari Dam is a gravity dam located in Gifu Prefecture in Japan. The dam is used for power production. The catchment area of the dam is 4632.3 km2. The dam impounds about 141  ha of land when full and can store 9470 thousand cubic meters of water. The construction of the dam was started on 1936 and completed in 1939.

References

Dams in Gifu Prefecture
1939 establishments in Japan